Mokopirirakau galaxias is a species of gecko in the family Diplodactylidae found in New Zealand. It is endemic to New Zealand.

See also
Geckos of New Zealand

References

Mokopirirakau
Reptiles of New Zealand
Reptiles described in 2021